Ahmed Salah El Din (born 30 September 1990) is an Egyptian badminton player. He started playing badminton since 1999, and was selected to join the national team in 2005.

Achievements

African Games 
Men's doubles

African Championships 
Men's singles

Men's doubles

Mixed doubles

BWF International Challenge/Series (8 titles, 12 runners-up) 
Men's doubles

Mixed doubles

  BWF International Challenge tournament
  BWF International Series tournament
  BWF Future Series tournament

References

External links 
 
 

Living people
1990 births
Sportspeople from Cairo
Egyptian male badminton players
Competitors at the 2015 African Games
Competitors at the 2019 African Games
African Games bronze medalists for Egypt
African Games medalists in badminton
Competitors at the 2018 Mediterranean Games
Competitors at the 2022 Mediterranean Games
Mediterranean Games competitors for Egypt
21st-century Egyptian people